Nangang may refer to:

Mainland China
Nangang District, Harbin (南岗区) in Harbin, Heilongjiang Province
Nangang station (Guangzhou Metro) (南岗站) in Huangpu District, Guangzhou, Guangdong Province
Nangang station (Hefei Metro) (南岗站), on Line 2 (Hefei Metro) in Shushan District, Hefei, Anhui Province
Nangang railway station (南岗站), station of the Guangzhou–Shenzhen Railway in Huangpu District, Guangzhou, Guangdong Province

Taiwan
Nangang District, Taipei (南港區)
Nangang station (南港站), metro, Taiwan Railways, and Taiwan High Speed Rail station in Nangang, Taipei